Plant seed peroxygenase (plant peroxygenase, soybean peroxygenase) is an enzyme with systematic name substrate:hydroperoxide oxidoreductase (RH-hydroxylating or epoxidising). This enzyme catalyses the following chemical reaction

 R1H + R2OOH  R1OH + R2OH

This enzyme is a heme protein that contains calcium binding motif.

References

External links 
 

EC 1.11.2